Otis Catrell Leverette (born May 31, 1978 in Americus, to Leroy and Ruby Smith. Georgia) is a former American football defensive end in the National Football League for the Miami Dolphins, Washington Redskins, San Diego Chargers, and the San Francisco 49ers.  He played college football at the University of Alabama at Birmingham.He currently resides in Birmingham, AL and has three sons. In 2006, he founded Modernday Fitness, an athletic training program that focuses on creating a well- rounded athlete. His passion for sports and educating athletes on proper technique, mental toughness, and physical strength led him to create what is now a comprehensive program, for the athlete that aspires to play at the next level in any sport. His love for sports started at an early age while playing little league baseball and football in Americus, GA.

He continued to excel in athletics in high school and lettered in five sports throughout his high school career. He attended Middle Georgia Community College on a football scholarship and is a 2-time Junior College All- American. He continued his education at the University of Alabama at Birmingham. There, he was named Defensive Captain in 2000, and graduated with a degree in Sociology. In 2001, Otis Leverette was drafted into the National Football League as a Defensive End for the Miami Dolphins. Leverette embarked on an NFL career that allowed him to play for the Washington Redskins, the San Francisco 49ers, and the San Diego Chargers. In 2003, Otis Leverette was recognized by the Alabama House of Representatives for his career with the NFL as well as his accomplishments off the field.

Early life
Leverette attended Americus High School in Americus, Georgia and participated in football, basketball, wrestling, baseball, and track and field.  In football, he was a three-year letterman and as a senior, he was named the Regional Defensive Player of the Year.

Junior College career
Leverette attended Middle Georgia College and was a letterman in football.  In football, he was a two-year starter and as a sophomore, he was a JUCO All-America selection.

References

1978 births
Living people
American football defensive ends
Miami Dolphins players
People from Americus, Georgia
San Diego Chargers players
San Francisco 49ers players
UAB Blazers football players
Washington Redskins players
People from Hueytown, Alabama